Hupodonta pulcherrima is a species of moth of the family Notodontidae first described by Frederic Moore in 1866. It is found in the Indian state of Sikkim and the Chinese provinces of Yunnan and Xizang.

References

Moths described in 1866
Notodontidae